Sirpur  is a village in Dondiluhara tehsil, Durg district, Chhattisgarh, India.

Demographics
In the 2001 India census, the village of Sirpur in Durg district had a population of 381, with 193 males (50.7%) and 188 females (49.3%), for a gender ratio of 974 females per thousand males.

See also
Sirpur, Kanker, a village in Pakhanjore tehsil, Kanker district

References

Villages in Durg district